Julien Marchand (born 10 May 1995) is a French rugby union player. His position is hooker and he currently plays for Toulouse in the Top 14.

International career

International tries

Personal life
Marchand is the older brother of Guillaume Marchand, who plays for Lyon OU as a hooker.

Honours

International 
 France
Six Nations Championship: 2022
Grand Slam: 2022

Club 
 Toulouse
Top 14: 2018–19, 2020–21
European Rugby Champions Cup: 2020–2021

References

External links
France profile at FFR
Stade Toulousain profile
L'Équipe profile

1995 births
Living people
French rugby union players
Stade Toulousain players
France international rugby union players
Rugby union hookers
People from Saint-Gaudens, Haute-Garonne
Sportspeople from Haute-Garonne